Bhichai Rattakul (16 September 1924 – 28 February 2022) was a Thai politician who served as the Deputy Prime Minister from 1983 to 1990 and 1997 to 2000, Speaker of the House of Representatives, and President of the National Assembly. He was also leader of the Democrat Party between 1982 and 1990, and the World President of Rotary International from 2002 to 2004.

Early life and education 
Bhichai Rattakul (陳裕財) was born on 16 September 1924 into a Thai Chinese family. He graduated from Bangkok Christian College and St Stephen's College in Hong Kong.

Political career 
He served as the Deputy Prime Minister between 1983-1990 and 1997–2000, the Speaker of the House of Representatives and the President of the National Assembly, the leader of the Democrat Party between 1982 and 1990, and the World President of Rotary International between 2002 and 2004.

He was a past president of Rotary International, serving from 2002 to 2004, as well as an advisor and member of Rotary Club of Bangkok, the first Rotary Club in Thailand.

Personal life 
He was married to Khunying Jaruay Rattakul and had two sons and one daughter, whose names are Bhichit Rattakul, the former Governor of Bangkok between 1996 and 2000, Anatchai Rattakul and Khunying Patchari Wongphaitoon.

Death 
Bhichai died of lung cancer at Siriraj Hospital, on 28 February 2022, at the age of 97.

Honours 
  Order of the White Elephant
  Order of the Crown of Thailand

References

External links
 พิชัย รัตตกุล Saviour ของ BAGOC
 Bhichai Rattakul 2002 – 2003

1924 births
2022 deaths
Bhichai Rattakul
Bhichai Rattakul
Bhichai Rattakul
Bhichai Rattakul
Bhichai Rattakul
Bhichai Rattakul
Bhichai Rattakul
Bhichai Rattakul
Bhichai Rattakul
Bhichai Rattakul
Rotary International leaders 
Deaths from lung cancer 
Deaths from cancer in Thailand